First round of the Vojvodina provincial elections was held on September 19, 2004, at the same time when the local elections were held in the whole of Serbia (with the exception of the Autonomous Province of Kosovo).

Second round of elections was held on October 3, 2004.

Rules 
There are 120 MPs in Vojvodina's Parliament. One half (60 MPs) is elected based on a proportional representation one-round system, according to which Vojvodina is one electoral unit. Voters choose between several Parties, Coalitions or Citizen Groups. The other 60 MPs are elected based on majority two-round system, according to which Vojvodina is divided into 60 electoral units in a way that every county gives at least one MP. Some larger electoral units, like the cities of Novi Sad, Subotica, Zrenjanin etc., give more (from 2 up to 7). In this case, voters choose between more candidates. A candidate can win in first round if he/she gets more than 50%+1 votes of those who voted. If none gets enough votes, the two strongest candidates go to the second round, in which the one with more votes wins.

The election threshold for Parties, Coalitions and Citizen's Groups is 5%, except for Parties of minority groups (Hungarians, Croats, etc.), for whom the threshold is smaller, but not smaller than the number of votes necessary to get one MP. According to the law, on all lists of Parties, Coalitions and Citizen's Groups at least 30% of the proposed MPs must be women.

Participants

Lists that competed in one-round system
 Democratic Party (Demokratska stranka)Boris Tadić
 Alliance of Vojvodina Hungarians (Savez vojvođanskih Mađara - Vajdasági Magyar Szövetség)Kasza József 
 Serbian Radical Party (Srpska radikalna stranka)Tomislav Nikolić 
 "Together for Vojvodina" ("Zajedno za Vojvodinu")Nenad Čanak
 League of Vojvodina Social Democrats (Liga socijaldemokrata Vojvodine)
 Democratic Vojvodina (Demokratska Vojvodina)
 Vojvodina Union - Vojvodina my home (Vojvođanska unijaVojvodina moj dom)
 Union of Socialists of Vojvodina (Unija socijalista Vojvodine)
 Vojvodinian Movement (Vojvođanski pokret)
 Civic Alliance of Serbia (Građanski savez Srbije)
 Social Democratic Union (Socijaldemokratska unija)
 G17 Plus (G17+)Miroljub Labus 
 Socialist Party of Serbia (Socijalistička partija Srbije)Dušan Bajatović
 Democratic Party of Serbia (Demokratska stranka Srbije)Vojislav Koštunica 
 "Clean hands of Vojvodina" ("Čiste ruke Vojvodine")Miodrag Isakov
 Reformists of Vojvodina (Reformisti Vojvodine)
 Serbian Renewal Movement (Srpski pokret obnove)
 Resistance (Otpor)
 Strength of Serbia Movement (Politički pokret „Snaga Srbije”)Bogoljub Karić 
 New Serbia (Nova Srbija)Velimir Ilić

Results

Aftermath
A governing coalition was formed comprising the Democratic Party, Together for Vojvodina, Alliance of Vojvodina Hungarians, and Strength of Serbia Movement, which together hold 66 seats in the Assembly - a majority of 12.

Democratic Party Vice-President Bojan Pajtić was elected President of the Executive Council and Bojan Kostreš from the League of Vojvodina Social Democrats was elected President of the Assembly.

References

See also 
 Parliament of Vojvodina
Vojvodina
Politics of Vojvodina

Elections in Vojvodina
Vojvodina
Vojvodina